The 2013 Maui Challenger was a professional tennis tournament played on hard courts. It was the fourth edition of the tournament which was part of the 2013 ATP Challenger Tour. It took place in Maui, United States at the Wailea Tennis Club between 20 and 27 January 2013.

Singles main-draw entrants

Seeds

 1 Rankings are as of 14 January 2013.

Other entrants
The following players received wildcards into the singles main draw:
  Devin Britton
  Dennis Lajola
  Ma Rong
  Petr Michnev

The following players received entry from the qualifying draw:
  Jean Andersen
  Carsten Ball
  Takuto Niki
  Hiroki Kondo

Doubles main-draw entrants

Seeds

 1 Rankings are as of 14 January 2013.

Other entrants
The following pairs received wildcards into the doubles main draw:
  Rick Kepler /  Dennis Lajola
  Daniel Kosakowski /  Michael McClune
  Mikael Maata /  Jan Tribler

The following pairs received entry as a qualifier into the doubles main draw:
  Petr Michnev /  Gerald Moretti

Champions

Singles

 Go Soeda def.  Mischa Zverev, 7–5, 7–5

Doubles

 Lee Hsin-han /  Peng Hsien-yin def.  Tennys Sandgren /  Rhyne Williams, 6–7(1–7), 6–2, [10–5]

References

External links
Official Website

Maui Challenger
ATP Challengers in Hawaii
Maui Challenger
Maui Challenger
Maui Challenger